Monotomidae is a family of beetles in the superfamily Cucujoidea. The family is found worldwide, with approximately 240 species in 33 genera. The ecological habits of the family are diverse, with different members of the group being found under tree bark, in decaying vegetation, on flowers and in ant nests. Their ecology is obscure, while at least some species are mycophagous, feeding on the fruiting bodies of ascomycete fungi, Rhyzophagus are predators on bark beetles (includings, eggs, larvae and young adults) and possibly Phoridae larvae, with the larvae of some species also being mycophagous.

Taxonomy 
Monotomidae contains the following genera:

 Rhizophaginae Redtenbacher 1845
Rhizophagus Herbst, 1793
Subfamiliy Monotominae
Tribe Lenacini Crowson, 1952
Lenax Sharp, 1877
Tribe Monotomini Laporte, 1840
 Monotoma Herbst, 1793
 Tribe Thionini Crowson, 1952
 Thione Sharp, 1899
 Shoguna Lewis, 1884
 Arunus Sen Gupta & Pal, 1995
 Tribe Europini Sen Gupta, 1988
Afrobaenus Sen Gupta & Pal, 1995
 Aneurops Sharp, 1900
 Bactridium J.LeConte, 1861
 Barunius Sen Gupta & Pal, 1995
 Crowsonius Pakaluk & Slipinski, 1993
 Eporus Grouvelle, 1897
 Europs Wollaston, 1854
 Hesperobaenus J.LeConte, 1861
 Hiekesia Sen Gupta & Pal, 1995
 Indoleptipsius Pal, 2000
 Kakamodes Sen Gupta & Pal, 1995
 Leptipsius Casey, 1916
 Macreurops Casey, 1916
 Malabica Sen Gupta, 1988
 Malinica Sen Gupta, 1988
 Mimema Wollaston, 1861
 Mimemodes Reitter, 1876
 Monotomopsis Grouvelle, 1896
 Monotopion Reitter, 1884
 Noveurops Sen Gupta & Pal, 1995
 Pararhizophagus Méquignon, 1913
 Phyconomus LeConte, 1861
 Pycnotomina Casey, 1916
 Renuka Sen Gupta, 1988
 Rhizophagoides Nakane & Hisamatsu, 1963
 Rumnicus Sen Gupta & Pal, 1995
 Tarunius Sen Gupta, 1977

Fossil genera 

 †Jurorhizophagus Cai et al. 2015 Daohugou, China, Middle Jurassic (Callovian)
 †Cretakarenni Peris and Delclòs 2015 Spanish amber, Escucha Formation, Early Cretaceous (Albian), Burmese amber, Myanmar, Late Cretaceous (Cenomanian)
 †Cretolenax Liu et al. 2019 Burmese amber, Myanmar, Cenomanian
 †Rhizobactron Kirejtshuk 2013 Lebanese amber, Early Cretaceous (Barremian)
 †Rhizophtoma Kirejtshuk and Azar 2009 Lebanese amber, Barremian, Alava amber, Escucha Formation, Spain, Albian

References

 
Cucujoidea families